Alpheus deuteropus or the petroglyph shrimp is a snapper or pistol shrimp in the family Alpheidae. It lives on coral reefs in tropical parts of the Indian and Pacific Oceans and in the Red Sea, as a commensal of corals such as Porites lobata. Its presence among the lobes leaves tunnels, cracks and grooves in the surface.

Like other snapper shrimp, one of the chelipeds is much bigger than the other and is modified to make an explosive clicking noise. The body is only slightly laterally compressed and does not have a crest on the carapace. There is an orbital hood surrounding the eyes.

References

Alpheidae
Taxa named by Franz Martin Hilgendorf
Crustaceans described in 1879